Cytaea vitiensis is a species of jumping spider.

Name
The species is named for its occurrence on the island of Viti Levu.

Distribution
Cytaea vitiensis is only known from Viti Levu, Fiji.

External links
  (1998): Salticidae of the Pacific Islands. III.  Distribution of Seven Genera, with Description of Nineteen New Species and Two New Genera. Journal of Arachnology 26(2): 149-189. PDF

Endemic fauna of Fiji
vitiensis
Spiders of Fiji
Spiders described in 1998